Chidambaram division is a revenue division in the Cuddalore district of Tamil Nadu, India.

References 
 

Cuddalore district